Peoria High School is a public high school in Peoria, Illinois.  Peoria High School was established in 1856 and is the second oldest continually operating high school west of the Allegheny Mountains after Evansville Central High School in Indiana.  Peoria High is located at 1615 N. North Street and moved to this location in 1916.  Peoria High School is commonly referred to as "Central" to distinguish it from Richwoods and Manual, and it is centrally located in Peoria. Peoria is the only city in the Peoria metro area with multiple high schools.

The school had a 150th all-school reunion and celebration in June 2006 at the Peoria Civic Center.

Sports
Peoria High is a member of the Big Twelve Conference (Illinois) in athletics, and the school mascot is the Lions. The school mascot was the Maroons until the late 1940s when it was changed. The school colors are maroon, black, and white. Their longtime rivals are the Peoria Manual Rams.

Student council
The student council of Peoria High School is a part of the Hopewell District of the Illinois Association of Student Councils. They take part in (as well as host) a multitude of events for student councils throughout the state.

Alumni
 Harry Bay (1878-1952), professional baseball player
 Edward Fitzsimmons Dunne (1853-1937), 38th Mayor of Chicago and 24th Governor of Illinois
 Philip José Farmer (1918-2009), writer best known for his Riverworld series of science fiction novels and who also wrote pastiches of famous pulp-fiction characters, including a biography of Tarzan
 Harry Frazee (1880-1929), theatrical impresario, owner of Boston Red Sox who sold Babe Ruth to the New York Yankees
 Betty Friedan (1921–2006), activist and author of the Feminine Mystique
 Danny Goodwin (b. 1953), former MLB player (California Angels, Minnesota Twins, Oakland Athletics) first player from a Historically Black University to be inducted into the National College Baseball Hall of Fame
 A. J. Guyton (class of 1996), NBA player for Chicago Bulls and Golden State Warriors
 John Grier Hibben (1861-1933), academic who succeeded Woodrow Wilson as President of Princeton University
 Curley "Boo" Johnson (class of 1981), Harlem Globetrotters
 Ralph Lawler (b. 1938), television and radio play-by-play announcer, best known as the long-time voice of the Los Angeles Clippers of the NBA
 Shaun Livingston (class of 2004), former professional basketball player and executive for the Golden State Warriors: Brooklyn Nets, Los Angeles Clippers, Oklahoma City Thunder, Washington Wizards, Miami Heat, Charlotte Bobcats, Milwaukee Bucks, Warriors, Houston Rockets. Won four championships with the Warriors: three as a player and one as an executive
 Annie Malone (1869-1957), African American entrepreneur and philanthropist
 Howard Maple (1903-1970), former MLB and NFL player (Washington Senators and Chicago Cardinals)
 Robert Michel, (1923-2017), U.S. Congressman, 1957-1995
 Richard Pryor, (1940-2005), African American stand-up comedian, actor, and writer
 Jim Robertson (1928-2015), former MLB player (Philadelphia Athletics)
 Matt Savoie (b. 1980), Olympic figure skater who skated during the 2006 Winter Olympics in Turin, Italy.
 John Shalikashvili (1936–2011), U.S. Army general and Chairman of the Joint Chiefs of Staff (1993–1997)
 Dick Weik (1927–1991), former MLB player Washington Senators, Cleveland Indians, Detroit Tigers, inducted into the Greater Peoria Sports Hall of Fame in 2016.
 John Dailey (1867-1929), Illinois State Senator and Representative
 Frank "Spig" Wead (1895-1947) Navy Commander, John Wayne played Wead in the movie "The Wings of Eagles".

References

External links
 
 Peoria High School Alumni Association — official website

Educational institutions established in 1856
Public high schools in Illinois
Education in Peoria, Illinois
Schools in Peoria County, Illinois
1856 establishments in Illinois